Henry Hart (born 1954) is the Hickman Professor of Humanities at the College of William and Mary in Williamsburg, Virginia. In addition to three books of poetry (The Ghost Ship (1990),  The Rooster Mask (1998),  and Background Radiation (2007)) he has written critical works on such poets as Seamus Heaney, Geoffrey Hill, and Robert Lowell. He edited The James Dickey Reader (1999) and his biography James Dickey: The World as a Lie (2000), was a finalist in nonfiction for the Southern Book Critics Circle Award.  He also edited The Wadsworth Themes in American Literature Series (2009). (2009) His poems and essays have appeared in The New Yorker, Poetry, Kenyon Review, Southern Review, Sewanee Review, Denver Quarterly, and numerous other journals. Hart was a founding editor of Verse, an international poetry journal. In 2010, he won the Carole Weinstein Prize for Poetry. On July 2, 2018, he was sworn in as the 17th Poet Laureate of Virginia in the commonwealth's capital of Richmond.

References

External links 

 Stuart A. Rose Manuscript, Archives, and Rare Book Library, Emory University: James Dickey: The World as a Lie research files, 1990-2005

Poets Laureate of Virginia
College of William & Mary faculty
American academics of English literature
Living people
1954 births